is a Japanese football player.

Playing career
Yamagishi was born in Kumagaya on 17 May 1978. After graduating from Chukyo University, he joined J1 League club Urawa Reds based in his local Saitama Prefecture in 2001. He debuted in 2002 and became a regular goalkeeper. However he lost his position behind new player Ryota Tsuzuki in 2003. From 2003, Yamagishi battled with Tsuzuki for the position until 2010. Reds won the champions in 2003 J.League Cup. In 2005, although he could hardly play in the match, Reds won the champions Emperor's Cup. In 2006, he became a regular goalkeeper from May and Reds won J1 League champions. Although he could hardly play in the match from 2007, he became a regular goalkeeper again from September 2009. In 2010, he played full-time in all 34 matches. However he could not play many matches behind Nobuhiro Kato from 2011. In 2014, he could not play at all in the match behind new player Shusaku Nishikawa.

In June 2014, Yamagishi moved to J2 League club Montedio Yamagata. He became a regular goalkeeper soon. He entered in the history of Japanese football for scoring in 2014 J2 League playoffs match against Júbilo Iwata. In the 91st minute of the game, he headed the 1-1 from a corner kick: a result which let Montedio go through to the final. At the final, Montedio won the match and was promoted to J1. Montedio also won the 2nd place in 2014 Emperor's Cup. In 2015, although he played full-time in all 34 matches, Montedio finished at the bottom place and was relegated to J2 end of 2015 season. He played for the club until end of 2016 season.

After three seasons with Montedio, Yamagishi decided to move to Giravanz Kitakyushu, which just got relegated to J3 League. He retired end of 2018 season.

Club statistics
Updated to 1 January 2019.

1Includes other competitive competitions, including the J.League Championship, Japanese Super Cup, A3 Champions Cup and J2 League Playoffs.

Honours

Club
Urawa Reds
AFC Champions League: 1
 2007
J1 League: 1
 2006
Emperor's Cup: 2
 2005, 2006
J.League Cup: 1
 2003
Japanese Super Cup: 1
 2006

Montedio Yamagata
J2 League Playoffs: 1
 2014

References

External links

Profile at Giravanz Kitakyushu

1978 births
Living people
Chuo University alumni
Association football people from Saitama Prefecture
Japanese footballers
J1 League players
J2 League players
J3 League players
Urawa Red Diamonds players
Montedio Yamagata players
Giravanz Kitakyushu players
Association football goalkeepers